The walls of Avignon are a series of defensive stone walls that surround the city of Avignon in the south of France. They were originally built in the 14th century during the Avignon papacy and have been continually rebuilt and repaired throughout their subsequent history.

The walls replaced an earlier double set of defensive walls that had been completed in the first two decades of the 13th century. During the Albigensian Crusade the town sided with the Count of Toulouse, Raymond VII but in 1226, after a three-month siege by Louis VIII of France, Avignon capitulated and was forced to dismantle the walls and fill in the moats. Beginning in around 1231, the defences were rebuilt. Although these early walls have not survived, their path is preserved in the street plan of the city.

In 1309 Pope Clement V moved to Avignon and under the papacy the town expanded outside the limits of the earlier city walls. From the 1350s during the Hundred Years' War the town became vulnerable to pillage by marauding bands of mercenaries and in 1357 under Innocent VI, the fifth Avignon pope, work began on the construction of new set of city walls to enclose the expanded town. The walls took nearly 20 years to complete.

There were originally twelve gates controlling access to the city but this number was reduced to seven when the fortifications were modified between 1481 and 1487. There are now 15 vehicular entrances and 11 pedestrian entrances.

Early fortifications

Historians had assumed that during the Roman period Avignon would have been defended by a wall, but this is now considered unlikely. A large amount of rescue archaeology has taken place in Avignon since the 1960s, especially around the Place de l'Horloge. This has revealed many details of the Roman town but no evidence has been found for a defensive wall.

In late antiquity a rudimentary wall was erected by reusing material from Roman monuments. It was centred on the Rocher des Doms and enclosed a much smaller area than the Roman town. This wall is mentioned by the Gallo-Roman historian Gregory of Tours when describing the siege of the town by the Frankish king, Clovis I, in around 500 AD.

13th century double walls

In the 12th century the town enjoyed a degree of independence and became very prosperous. A bridge was built across the Rhône, the Pont Saint-Bénézet whose construction is traditionally dated to between 1177 and 1185. There are no surviving records of when the first city wall was built but historians have suggested dates between 1060 and 1176.

In the first two decades of the 13th century the town added a second wall with a second moat outside the earlier wall. Built into the outer wall were a series semi-circular towers. Access to the town was provided by twelve pairs of gates, each pair consisting of a gate in the inner wall and another in the outer. Water for the moats came from the Sorgue through the Canal de Vaucluse. After 1229, additional water was also provided from the Durance by the Canal de l'Hôpital (La Durançole).

During the Albigensian Crusade the town sided with the Count of Toulouse, Raymond VII. In 1226 the French king, Louis VIII, descended the Rhône valley with a papal legate and a large army en route to a new campaign against the Albigensians. Avignon refused to open its gates but after a siege lasting three months (10 June until 12 September) the city was forced by famine to capitulate. One of the conditions imposed on the town was the dismantling of the city walls. The town rebuilt the defences between 1234 and 1237, presumably on the same plan, but in 1251 Avignon lost its independence when the two younger brothers of King Louis IX, Alphonse of Poitiers and Charles of Anjou (Charles I of Naples) took back control and appointed a viguier (magistrate) to administer the town.

The only surviving piece of the 13th century fortifications is a small fragment of the outer wall at the junction of rue Joseph-Vernet with rue Saint-Charles. Much of the path of the double defence is preserved in the city plan as modern streets follow what was once the gap between the two city walls. Working clockwise from the northeast the walls followed the rue des Trois-Colombes, the rue Campane, the rue Paul-Saïn, the rue Philonarde, the rue des Lices, the rue Henri-Farbe, the rue Joseph-Vernet and the rue Grande-Fusterie. The path of early walls in northwest corner of the town near the Pont Saint-Bénézet is obscure due to the subsequent changes to the fortifications in this important area.

The pairs of arched gateways were retained long after the double set of walls had been demolished and are depicted on 16th and 17th century maps of the town. Many of the old gates were removed in the 18th century but the Portail de Pertuis was not demolished until 1847. The appearance of these gates is unknown as they are not depicted on any print or lithograph. The names of some gates have survived in the modern street names: rue Portail Biensen, rue du Portail Magnanen, rue Portail Matheron and Planet du Portail Peint.

Water from the Sorgue joined the outer moat near the Portail Imbert, flowed around the walls to the Portail l'Êveque and then flowed away to join the Rhône. With the development of the town the moat was vaulted over although the river remained visible along the rue des Teinturiers. In the covered section of the moat, which now serves as a main sewer, the external surfaces of the 13th century walls are clearly visible as are the lower portions the semi-circular towers. The façades of the buildings on the south side of the rue des Lice, rue Henri Fabre and rue Joseph Vernet are aligned with the remains of the outer city wall below ground.

Avignon papacy and the 14th century city walls

Pope Clement V moved the papacy from Rome to Avignon in 1309. This led to a large expansion of the town so that the free space within the double walls was soon exhausted. Church officials began building outside the old walls, joining the mendicant orders that had established monasteries outside the city gates in the previous century. The residents of these new suburbs lacked the protection provided by the walls but were exempt from paying the city taxes.

In 1348 Pope Clement VI purchased the town of Avignon from Joanna I of Naples, the Queen of Naples and Countess of Provence, for 80,000 gold florins. Prompted by the threat from the bands of marauding mercenaries (free companies) that were roaming elsewhere in France, sometime between 1355 and 1357 Pope Innocent VI decided to protect the expanded town with a new set of walls. The walls were to enclose a large lozenge shaped area that included the Chapelle Notre-Dame-des-Miracles in the southwest that had been founded by the second Avignon pope John XXII and the Hôpital Sainte-Marthe to the east that had recently been founded by the legal expert Bernard Rascas and his wife. The pope may have initially provided small sums for the project but from January 1358 the construction costs were paid for by a tax (gabelle) on wine brought into the town. Additional taxes were introduced on salt and general merchandise in 1363. The papacy also lent money to the town to allow the work to proceed more rapidly.

While work on the wall was progressing the town came under attack from unemployed mercenaries whose numbers increased when a truce in the Hundred Years' War was agreed in Bordeaux between the English and French forces in March 1357. In 1358 Pope Innocent VI bought off a group of mercenaries led by Arnaud de Cervole (known as the Archpriest) with a ransom of 1,000 gold florins.

The new suburbs  were protected with temporary wooden structures while the stone walls were being built. Limestone for the walls and towers came from a quarry on the other side of the Rhône above Villeneuve-lès-Avignon, wood came from Savoy, lime for the mortar came from Villeneuve-lès-Avignon and sand came from islands in the Rhône. By 1372 the new walls were sufficiently advanced to protect the town against a band of mercenaries en route to Italy. Work continued and in 1381 the merlons near the Dominican monastery (Porte des Prêcheurs) were rebuilt.

Except for a section near the Rhône between the Porte Saint-Jacques and the Rocher des Doms the walls were surrounded by a moat which was supplied with water from the Sorgue and the Durance. Each of the gates included a drawbridge, a portcullis and a pair of heavy wooden doors. The walls were crowned with a battlement which protected a walkway (chemin de ronde). The towers had tiled roofs and may have originally been fitted with wooded hoarding which were later replaced with stone.

15th century modifications
During the western schism (1378 to 1417) that followed the Avignon papacy, Aragonese troops paid by the antipope Benedict XIII defended the papal palace complex against attacks by people from the town. The walls near the bridge were damaged and in 1410 the tower controlling access to the bridge collapsed. It was rebuilt in 1414. Between 1479 and 1488 the walls were repaired and remodelled with the reduction in the number of gates from twelve to seven. The work was initiated by the papal legate Archbishop Giuliano della Rovere who subsequently became Pope Julius II.

16th century and the Wars of Religion

In the first half of the 16th century the crumbling towers were repaired and between 1524 and 1538 extra loopholes were pierced for the newly acquired cannons. In 1561 Pope Pius IV sent his cousin, Fabrizio Serbelloni, to organise the defence of the town against the Huguenots during the French Wars of Religion (1562–1598). The walls were repaired, and three of the gates were walled up. These were Porte Saint-Roch, Porte de l'Oulle and Porte de la Ligne. The remaining four gates were strengthened by the addition of protective fortifications (ravelins) outside the gates themselves.

From the second half of the 17th century some of the defensive structures were dismantled. Beginning in 1661 the three gates that had been walled up during the Wars of Religion were reopened, and a few years later all the drawbridges were removed. In 1679 some of the exterior fortifications protecting the Porte de Saint Michel were transformed into a triumphal arch dedicated to Pope Innocent XI (in post 1676–1689).

List of modern entrances
There are now around 25 entrances through the city walls.

See also
 Timeline of Avignon

Notes

References

Sources

Further reading

 
avignon